Shirlie Kemp (née Shirley Holliman; born 18 April 1962) is an English singer, who found fame in the 1980s with Wham! and as part of the duo Pepsi & Shirlie.

Early years
Shirley Holliman was child four of five born to Arthur and Margaret Holliman and raised on a council estate in Bushey, near Watford, Hertfordshire. Holliman intended to train as a horse riding instructor, but after she developed hay fever at age 18 and with nothing else to do, her then boyfriend Andrew Ridgeley suggested she come and dance while he and his friend George Michael's band played a local gig.

Music career

Holliman was never a band member of what became Wham! but, like her friend Dee C. Lee, was paid on a per performance basis as a backing singer, and continued to live with her parents. After Lee left to join the Style Council and later marry its lead singer Paul Weller, she was replaced by "Pepsi" DeMacque, and this duo performed on all the Wham! songs and concerts. As George Michael desired to create music targeted to a more sophisticated audience than Wham!'s primarily teenage fan base, the announcement of Wham!'s break-up was made in the spring of 1986, with a grand finale concert at Wembley Stadium on 28 June 1986, called 'The Final'.

During their Wham! career, Holliman and DeMacque decided to form their own act, named Pepsi & Shirlie. Created immediately after the Wembley concert with an upbeat and more pop genre sound, they had two UK top 10 hits: "Heartache", which was produced by Phil Fearon and Tambi Fernando, reaching #2 on the UK Singles Chart behind the #1 hit of George Michael and Aretha Franklin's "I Knew You Were Waiting (For Me)", and "Goodbye Stranger", produced by Tambi Fernando and Pete Hammond, which reached #9.

The duo with DeMacque went on hiatus in 1989, but briefly returned in 2000 to record backing vocals on the UK number one Geri Halliwell hit "Bag It Up". The duo also re-united to perform for the 'Here and Now 10th Anniversary tour' which began on 24 June 2011.

On 29 November 2002, Holliman was a back-up vocalist in the Concert for George, a concert celebrating the music of the late George Harrison.

In November 2019, Holliman and her husband released their first album together as Martin & Shirlie, titled In the Swing of It via Sony Music. The album contains duet covers of classic jazz standards plus two original songs written by their daughter Harleymoon Kemp.

In January 2023, Holliman appeared alongside her husband Martin Kemp on the fourth series of The Masked Singer as "Cat & Mouse".

Personal life
Holliman was in a relationship with Andrew Ridgley, whom she described as very charismatic, for two years.  Following their break up, George Michael encouraged her to telephone Spandau Ballet bassist and singer Martin Kemp, who had given her his number. She retired from steady performing after the birth of their daughter. Holliman had met Kemp through mutual friend George Michael, and the pair married in St. Lucia in 1988. They went on to have two children: daughter Harley Moon Kemp (born August 1989), and son Roman Kemp (born January 1993). Holliman and daughter Harley had brief roles together in the music video for the Spice Girls' "Mama".

After Holliman took time out from work to care for her husband through his illness with brain tumours, she was declared bankrupt in September 1996, and the family moved from Hampstead Heath to Muswell Hill to allow Kemp to recover. Holliman then went to work managing Aegean, a business associated with music and entertainment production.

In October 2020, Holliman with her husband published Shirlie and Martin Kemp: It's a Love Story, an autobiography-come-relationship advice book. The Kemps said the book was published in response to "growing media interest" in the couple's longlasting relationship.

In 2021, Holliman appeared with her son in the documentary Roman Kemp: Our Silent Emergency in which Kemp revealed that he came close to attempting suicide after battling with depression for 13 years.

'Shirlie Kemp' released under her married name, her personal account of the wild times touring with Wham!  The joint autobiography, Pepsi & Shirlie: It's All Black and White, written with her friend, Pepsi DeMacque-Crockett which was published by Welbeck in 2021.

Bibliography

References

1962 births
Living people
People from Bushey
Musicians from Hertfordshire
Holliman, Shirlie